Program Files is the directory name of a standard folder in Microsoft Windows operating systems in which applications that are not part of the operating system are conventionally installed. Typically, each application installed under the 'Program Files' directory will have a subdirectory for its application-specific resources. Shared resources, for example resources used by multiple applications from one company, are typically stored in the 'Common Program Files' directory.

Overview
In a standard Windows installation, the 'Program Files' directory will be at %SystemDrive%\Program Files (or the localized equivalent thereof), and the 'Common Program Files' (or the localized equivalent thereof) will be a subdirectory under 'Program Files'. In Windows Vista and later, the paths to the 'Program Files' and 'Common Program Files' directories are not localized on disk. Instead, the localized names are NTFS junction points to the non-localized locations. Additionally, the Windows shell localizes the name of the Program Files folder depending on the system's user interface display language.

Both 'Program Files' and 'Common Program Files' can be moved. At system startup, the actual paths to 'Program Files' and 'Common Program Files' are loaded from the Windows registry, where they are stored in the ProgramFilesDir and CommonFilesDir values under HKEY_LOCAL_MACHINE\SOFTWARE\Microsoft\Windows\CurrentVersion. They are then made accessible to the rest of the system via the volatile environment variables %ProgramFiles%, and %CommonProgramFiles%. Applications can also obtain the locations of these paths by querying the Setup API using dirids, or through Windows Management Instrumentation, or by querying the shell using CSIDLs, or ShellSpecialFolderConstants. These are all localization-independent methods.

x86-64 and IA-64 versions of Windows have two folders for application files: The Program Files folder serves as the default installation target for 64-bit programs, while the Program Files (x86) folder is the default installation target for 32-bit programs that need WoW64 emulation layer. While 64-bit Windows versions also have a %ProgramFiles(x86)% environment variable, the dirids and CSIDLs are not different between 32-bit and 64-bit environments; the APIs merely return different results, depending on whether the calling process is emulated or not.

To be backwards compatible with the 8.3 limitations of the old File Allocation Table filenames, the names 'Program Files', 'Program Files (x86)' and 'Common Program Files' are shortened by the system to progra~N and common~N, where N is a digit, a sequence number that on a clean install will be 1 (or 1 and 2 when both 'Program Files' and 'Program Files (x86)' are present).

If Windows is installed on an NTFS volume, by default, the 'Program Files' folder can only be modified by members of the 'Administrators' user groups. This can be an issue for programs created for Windows 9x. Those operating systems had no file system security, and programs could therefore also store their data in 'Program Files'. Programs that store their data in 'Program Files' will usually not run correctly on Windows NT systems with normal user privileges unless security is lowered for the affected subdirectories. Windows Vista addressed this issue by introducing File and Registry Virtualization. When this virtualization is enabled for a process, Windows saves changes to the 'Program Files' folder to %LocalAppData%\VirtualStore\Program Files (x86).

Localization

See also
WinFS
File system
Directory (computing)
64-bit computing

References

microsoft.com, Microsoft does not support changing the location of the Program Files folder by modifying the ProgramFilesDir registry value
microsoft.com, Why is the Program Files directory called Program Files instead of just Programs?
producthelp.sdl.com, The Windows system folders - General overview.
Windows XP in a Nutshell, By David Aaron Karp, Tim O'Reilly, Troy Mott, page 512
superuser.com, How can I find the short path of a Windows directory/file?
helpdeskgeek.com, Why Does Windows 7 64-bit Need Two Program Files Folders?
quepublishing.com, The Windows XP Layout,  By Stu Sjouwerman,  Nov 7, 2003

File system directories
Microsoft Windows